Funny About Love is a 1990 American romantic comedy film directed by Leonard Nimoy and starring Gene Wilder in his first romantic lead.  With a screenplay by Norman Steinberg and David Frankel, the film is based on the article "Convention of the Love Goddesses" in Esquire Magazine by Bob Greene.

Plot
New York cartoonist Duffy Bergman marries gourmet chef Meg Lloyd. Meg wants to have a baby. Duffy agrees, but after unsuccessful attempts, Duffy encourages her to focus on her career and come back to the child issue later. After his mother's death, however, Duffy becomes fixated on wanting to have a child. Meg no longer sees this as a priority, as she's trying to open her own restaurant. The two start to have marital problems, leading to a separation.

Duffy travels to Arizona to speak at a Delta Gamma sorority convention. He explains that the Delta Gammas have always been his dream girls—his Love Goddesses. There he meets the much younger Daphne Delillo, and when she moves to New York to work as a network sports reporter, their attraction develops into a relationship. Daphne becomes pregnant. Duffy is happy to father a child, but uncomfortable with how fast this relationship is progressing. When she has a miscarriage, Daphne breaks up with him, believing that they were really staying in the relationship for the baby.

At his father's wedding, Duffy hears news about Meg and decides to go to her restaurant. He tries to reconcile with her, insisting that he doesn't care if they remain childless as long as he can be with her. Duffy discovers that Meg has adopted a baby boy.

Cast
 Gene Wilder as Duffy Bergman
 Christine Lahti as Meg Lloyd Bergman
 Mary Stuart Masterson as Daphne Delillo
 Robert Prosky as Emil Thomas Bergman
 Stephen Tobolowsky as Hugo
 David Margulies as Dr. Benjamin
 Wendie Malick as Nancy
 Celeste Yarnall as Madge
 Anne Jackson as Adele Bergman
 Susan Ruttan as Claire
 Freda Foh Shen as Nurse
 Regis Philbin as himself
 Patrick Ewing as himself

Post Production
The film was originally produced with Gene Wilder's character having three love interests - Christine Lahti, Mary Stuart Masterson, and Farrah Fawcett.  After test screenings, a decision was made to cut all of Fawcett's scenes and re-edit.  These edits were late in the production process, and it is believed that some promotional material was distributed with incorrect information.  Fawcett is not credited in the movie.

Release

Box office
Funny About Love opened in 1,213 theaters on September 21, 1990 and grossed $3,036,352 in its opening weekend, landing at #5, behind Goodfellas, Postcards from the Edges second weekend, Ghosts eleventh, and Narrow Margin. The film would eventually gross $8,141,292 in the domestic box office.

Critical reception
The film was panned by critics. Based on 7 reviews, the film has a 0% rating on review aggregator website Rotten Tomatoes.

Janet Maslin of the New York Times gave the film a mixed review.

Roger Ebert of the Chicago Sun-Times had nothing but disdain for the film, giving it only a half of a star rating out of the four stars scale he utilized.

Gene Siskel was also scathing in his review on Siskel and Ebert’s show At the Movies, remarking that unusually for him, during the screening of the film he stood up in horror at one scene taking place at a sporting event, and said to Ebert: “I’ve seen it all.”

References

External links
 
 
 

1990 films
1990 romantic comedy films
American romantic comedy films
Films directed by Leonard Nimoy
Films set in New York City
Films shot in New York City
Films about adoption
Paramount Pictures films
Films scored by Miles Goodman
Films with screenplays by Norman Steinberg
1990s English-language films
1990s American films